Colin McLoughlin is a British freelance writer. With his brother Denis McLoughlin, Colin created the comic book characters Swift Morgan, Roy Carson, Buffalo Bill, Sam English, and other comic book characters in the 1940s-1950s for the London publishing house TV. Boardman, Ltd. (Boardman Books).

Sources
Gore, Matthew H. Collector's Corner: Denis McLoughlin, Goldenage Treasury Volume One. AC Comics: Longwood, Florida, 2003. Unpaginated.

Year of birth missing (living people)
Living people
British writers
Place of birth missing (living people)